Dennis Joseph Ribant (born September 20, 1941) is a former pitcher in Major League Baseball who played for the New York Mets, Pittsburgh Pirates, Detroit Tigers, Chicago White Sox, St. Louis Cardinals, and Cincinnati Reds. He was traded by the Pirates to the Tigers for Dave Wickersham on November 28, 1967.

References

External links

Major League Baseball pitchers
New York Mets players
Pittsburgh Pirates players
Detroit Tigers players
Chicago White Sox players
St. Louis Cardinals players
Cincinnati Reds players
Baseball players from Detroit
Hawaii Islanders players
Eugene Emeralds players
Indianapolis Indians players
Buffalo Bisons (minor league) players
Columbus Jets players
Austin Senators players
Davenport Braves players
Tulsa Oilers (baseball) players
Denver Bears players
Toronto Maple Leafs (International League) players
Louisville Colonels (minor league) players
1941 births
Living people